

Canadian Football News in 1928
The Tri-City Rugby Football League was formed on August 25 and consisted of Moose Jaw, Regina and two teams from Winnipeg. The league played an unbalanced schedule. Provincial champions for the MRFU and SRFU were determined by head-to-head games of provincial rivals in the Tri-City League. The Union disbanded the following year because of travel expenses. Saskatchewan and Manitoba reverted to playing games within their respective provinces.

First radio play-by-play broadcast of a Grey Cup Game was on December 1.

Jack Hamilton served as president of the Western Interprovincial Football Union for the season.

Regular season

Final regular season standings
Note: GP = Games Played, W = Wins, L = Losses, T = Ties, PF = Points For, PA = Points Against, Pts = Points
*Bold text means that they have clinched the playoffs

League Champions

Grey Cup playoffs
Note: All dates in 1928

Western Inter-Collegiate Rugby Football Union - total points series 

University of Alberta Polar Bears win series.

ORFU semifinals

Varsity advances to the ORFU Final.

ORFU tie-breaker

Sarnia advances to the ORFU Final.

ORFU final

Varsity advances to the East Final.

East final

Hamilton advanced to the East Final game due to McGill declining to participate.

Western final

Regina advances to the Grey Cup game due to the Alberta and BC champions declining to participate due to the length of their seasons.

Playoff bracket

Grey Cup Championship

1928 Canadian Football Awards
 Jeff Russel Memorial Trophy (IRFU MVP) – Ernie Cox (C), Hamilton Tigers

References

 
Canadian Football League seasons